Apirana Pewhairangi (born 19 March 1992) is an Ireland international rugby league footballer who last played as a  or  for the Te Atatu Roosters in the Auckland Rugby League. He previously played for the Parramatta Eels in the NRL, the Wentworthville Magpies and New Zealand Warriors in the NSW Cup, and the London Broncos in the Betfred Championship.

He represented Ireland in the 2013 Rugby League World Cup. He briefly played rugby union signing for Irish provincial rugby union side Connacht in the Pro12.

Early life
Pewhairangi was born in Palmerston North, New Zealand. He is of Māori, and Irish descent. Growing up, Pewhairangi played junior rugby league for the Te Aroha Eels.

Rugby league career

Newcastle Knights (2009–2012)
Pewhairangi was signed by the Newcastle Knights in 2009. He played for the Knights' NYC team from 2010 to 2012, captaining the side in 2012. However Pewhairangi did not break into the first-grade side during his time with the Knights.

Parramatta Eels (2013–2014)
In 2013, Pewhairangi moved to the Parramatta Eels, and played for the Wentworthville Magpies in the NSW Cup. In round 9 of the 2013 NRL season he made his National Rugby League début for the Eels against the Brisbane Broncos.

New Zealand Warriors (2015)
On 27 November 2014, after attending an open trial for their NSW Cup side, Pewhairangi signed with the New Zealand Warriors for the 2015 season.

London Broncos (2016-2018)
On 12 May 2016, Kingstone Press Championship team London Broncos offered Pewairangi a 4-week trial at the club. He made his début in London's 62–4 home victory over Whitehaven, scoring 2 tries. After the game, the Broncos announced that they had signed Pewhairangi on a contract until the end of the 2017 season. In October 2017, having played 33 games for the London Broncos, and scored 22 tries, Pewhairangi signed a one-year contract extension, taking him to the end of the 2018 season.

New Zealand Warriors (2019-)
Pewhairangi rejoined the New Zealand Warriors for 2019, playing in the NRL trials match in February 2019 against the Melbourne Storm. He plays in their Canterbury Cup side as a half.

Te Atatu Roosters
In 2021 he joined the Te Atatū Roosters as captain.

Representative
In 2011, Pewhairangi represented the New Zealand Māori Residents in a match against the New Zealand Residents. In 2012, he was selected for the Junior Kiwis.

Pewhairangi qualified to play for Ireland through his grandmother from Lucan. Despite not having been capped before and not playing for the team at under-age level, Pewhairangi was named in the Irish squad for the 2013 World Cup. He played in two of Ireland's tournament games.

Rugby union career
In June 2015 it was announced that Pewhairangi would switch codes, joining Irish rugby union side Connacht. Pewhairangi trained with the squad in the 2015–16 preseason and featured in friendly matches against Grenoble and Castres. However he suffered an anterior cruciate ligament injury in the Castres game.

Ngati Porou East Coast
In 2022 at the conclusion of the rugby league season Pewhairangi moved to the East Coast and played 4 matches for Ngati Porou East Coast in the Heartland championship including the Lochore Cup final win over Mid Canterbury 25-20.

References

External links

New Zealand Warriors profile
London Broncos profile
2017 RLWC profile

(archived by web.archive.org) 2013 Parramatta Eels profile

1992 births
Living people
Central Coast Centurions players
Connacht Rugby players
Ireland national rugby league team players
Junior Kiwis players
London Broncos players
London Skolars players
New Zealand Māori rugby league players
New Zealand Māori rugby league team players
New Zealand people of Irish descent
New Zealand rugby league players
New Zealand rugby union players
Parramatta Eels players
Rugby league centres
Rugby league five-eighths
Rugby league players from Palmerston North
Rugby union centres
Rugby union players from Palmerston North
Wentworthville Magpies players